Qulluta (Quechua for mortar, also spelled Collota) is a mountain in the northern extensions of the Cordillera Blanca in the Andes of Peru which reaches a height of approximately . It is located in the Ancash Region, Sihuas Province, on the border of the districts of Alfonso Ugarte and Huayllabamba.

References 

Mountains of Peru
Mountains of Ancash Region